Kara Kara may refer to:

County of Kara Kara, Victoria, Australia
Electoral district of Kara Kara, a former electoral district in Victoria, Australia
Shire of Kara Kara, a former local government area in Victoria, Australia
HMAS Kara Kara, a Royal Australian Navy vessel during the Second World War
Cubone, a Pokémon
The Gayiri people of central Queensland, Australia

See also
Karakara, town in Niger
Karakara (film), a 2012 film
Kara (disambiguation)
Caracara (disambiguation)